Yoki may refer to:
Jojo Yoki, a Czech paraglider design
Yoki Koto Kiku, a Japanese shōnen manga series by Koge-Donbo
Joyous Life (yōki yusan or yōki gurashi), in Tenrikyo
Yoki, a Fullmetal Alchemist character
Yoki, the Canadian name for Chinese jump rope
Qi, a vital force forming part of any living entity in traditional Chinese culture